The 2010 season was Thai Port's 14th season in the top division of Thai football. This article shows statistics of the club's players in the season, and also lists all matches that the club played in the season.

Team kit

Chronological list of events
10 November 2009: The Thai Premier League 2010 season first leg fixtures were announced.
23 June 2010: Thai Port were knocked out of the FA Cup by Pattaya United in the third round.
24 October 2010: Thai Port finished in 4th place in the Thai Premier League.

Pre-season

League table

Matches

League

FA Cup

Third round

League Cup

First round

1st Leg

2nd Leg

Second round

1st Leg

2nd Leg

Isuzu Cup

Kor Royal Cup

Queen's Cup

AFC Cup

Group stage

Round of 16

Quarter-finals

1st Leg

2nd Leg

References

2010
Thai Port